The Humboldt Broncos are a Canadian junior "A" ice hockey team from Humboldt, Saskatchewan. Established in 1970, the Broncos play in the Saskatchewan Junior Hockey League.

History

The Broncos were established in 1970 by a group of local organizers. The team was originally affiliated with the Swift Current Broncos of the Western Hockey League, who supplied the team with team name, jerseys and some players. They also had a close affiliation that year with St Peter's College in nearby Muenster. The Broncos originally played at the Leo Parker Arena and then move into the new Elgar Petersen Arena since 1980, which has a capacity of 1,800. The team also won the 2003 and 2008 Royal Bank Cup (Canadian Junior A championship). The team's mascot is a horse named SlapShot. The team colors are green, gold black and white.

The Broncos are the most successful team in SJHL history, having won the league championship ten times, the Anavet Cup/Canalta Cup seven times, and the Royal Bank Cup twice.

In very early years under the guidance of Coach Dr. Terry Henning and GM Dr. Gerry Rooney in 1971–72, the Broncos defeated the Melville Millionaires in 5 games to win their first SJHL Championship and then went on to defeat the Dauphin Kings in 6 games to win the Anavet/Canalta Cup (Sk vs Man); eventually losing in 5 games to the Red Deer Rustlers in the Centennial Cup West Final. In 1972–73, the Broncos again were again Saskatchewan provincial Junior A champions. The Broncos were eliminated by Portage La Prairie in the controversial SK-MB cup playoffs.

The Humboldt Broncos won the league championship in 2007, defeating the Melville Millionaires 4 games to 1. The Broncos lost the Anavet Cup to the MJHL's Selkirk Steelers 4 games to 3. Game 7 was won by the Steelers 4–3 in quadruple overtime. Dean Brockman was voted Coach of the Year in 2007, 2008, and 2009.

The Humboldt Broncos won the league/Royal Bank championship twice, in 2003 and as well in 2008, defeating the Kindersley Klippers 4 games to 3. The Broncos won the Anavet Cup defeating the MJHL's Portage Terriers 4 games to 0. The last two games of the series were shutouts for the Broncos. The Broncos won the Royal Bank Cup against the AJHL's Camrose Kodiaks the final score: 1–0.

The Humboldt Broncos won the league championship in 2009 defeating the Melville Millionaires 4 games to 1. The Broncos won the Anavet Cup defeating the Portage Terriers (MJHL) 4 games to 3.  The last 2 games were won in overtime at Portage. The Broncos lost in the Royal Bank Cup final by a 2–0 score to the Vernon Vipers BCHL.

The Broncos won the SJHL championship in 2011–12 defeating the Weyburn Red Wings in six games. They went on to beat the Portage Terriers (MJHL) in seven games to win the last Anavet Cup Championship before losing to the Woodstock Slammers (MIJHL) on home ice in the 2012 RBC Cup semi-final 4–3 in overtime.

In 2012–13 the Broncos made it back to the SJHL finals where they lost to the Yorkton Terriers in six games losing 4–3 in the sixth game.

After the 2013–14 season longtime head coach Dean Brockman left the team to take a job as an assistant coach with the Saskatoon Blades of the Western Hockey League. The Broncos eventually hired Ryan Smith (who was the head coach of the Selkirk Steelers of the MJHL) as head coach.

In 2014–15, the Broncos lost to the Weyburn Red Wings in four games in the first round. After the season Smith left the team to take an assistant coaching position with the Swift Current Broncos of the Western Hockey League. The Broncos eventually hired Darcy Haugen (who was the head coach of The Peace River Navigators of the Alberta Junior B League and a former assistant coach with the Estevan Bruins) as head coach.

In 2015–16, the Broncos missed the playoffs for the first time since the 1979–80 season, marking the end of a playoff streak longer than the Detroit Red Wings' then active streak of 25 years.

In 2016–17, the Broncos finished 5th overall in the SJHL Standings but were swept by the Nipawin Hawks in the opening round of the SJHL playoffs.

Bus crash

In 2018, the Broncos had advanced to the SJHL semi-finals, but were trailing in the series against the Nipawin Hawks by 3–1 heading into Game 5 on April 6. En route to the game, the Broncos' team bus collided with a semi-truck on Highway 35 near Armley; the local RCMP reported 16 fatalities as a result of the accident, and the game was cancelled. The victims included 10 players, two coaches, a statistician, a broadcaster, the bus driver, and an athletic therapist. The remaining passengers, 13 players, received injuries, most of them serious. The president of the Saskatchewan Junior Hockey League, Bill Chow, has described the incident as tragic, heart-breaking, the league's "worst nightmare."

In December 2018, the Broncos were named the Canadian Newsmaker of the Year by the Canadian Press.

In their first game of the 2018–19 season following the crash, the Broncos lost to the team they had been playing in the finals, the Nipawin Hawks, by a score of 2–1. The game had pre-game and post-game ceremonies for all members involved in the crash. The Broncos qualified for the playoffs that season, but were eliminated in the second round.

The Broncos were in a position to qualify for the playoffs in the 2019–20 season, but the remainder of the season was cancelled due to the COVID-19 pandemic.

Season-by-season standings

The Saskatchewan Junior Hockey League (SJHL) was called the Saskatchewan Amateur Junior Hockey League (SAJHL) until the end of the 1972–73 season.

Playoffs
1971 Lost Final
Humboldt Broncos defeated Saskatoon Olympics 4-games-to-3
Weyburn Red Wings defeated Humboldt Broncos 4-games-to-1
1972 Won Provincial League Championship, Won Man/Sask championship, Lost Centennial West Final/Abbott Cup
Humboldt Broncos defeated Estevan Bruins 4-games-to-none
Humboldt Broncos defeated Saskatoon Olympics 4-games-to-none
Humboldt Broncos defeated Melville Millionaires 4-games-to-1 SAJHL CHAMPIONS
Humboldt Broncos defeated Dauphin Kings (MJHL) 4-games-to-2 MAN/SASK CHAMPIONS
Red Deer Rustlers (AJHL) defeated Humboldt Broncos 4-games-to-1
1973 Won League, Lost Man/Sask championship
Humboldt Broncos defeated Melville Millionaires 4-games-to-2
Humboldt Broncos defeated Prince Albert Raiders 4-games-to-none
Humboldt Broncos defeated Estevan Bruins 4-games-to-2 SAJHL CHAMPIONS
Portage Terriers (MJHL) defeated Humboldt Broncos 3-games-to-2; Humboldt forfeits due to Portage players' roughhouse physical tactics
1974 Lost Quarter-final
Prince Albert Raiders defeated Humboldt Broncos 4-games-to-none
1975 DNQ
1976 Lost Quarter-final
Swift Current Broncos defeated Humboldt Broncos 4-games-to-2
1977 Lost Quarter-final
Prince Albert Raiders defeated Humboldt Broncos 4-games-to-none
1978 Lost Quarter-final
Swift Current Broncos defeated Humboldt Broncos 4-games-to-none
1979 Lost Quarter-final
Swift Current Broncos defeated Humboldt Broncos 4-games-to-3
1980 DNQ
1981 Lost Semi-final
Humboldt Broncos defeated Swift Current Broncos 4-games-to-none
Prince Albert Raiders defeated Humboldt Broncos 4-games-to-none
1982 Lost Quarter-final
Prince Albert Raiders defeated Humboldt Broncos 4-games-to-none
1983 Lost Quarter-final
Moose Jaw Canucks defeated Humboldt Broncos 4-games-to-none
1984 Lost Quarter-final
Yorkton Terriers defeated Humboldt Broncos 4-games-to-1
1985 Lost Semi-final
Humboldt Broncos defeated Swift Current Indians 4-games-to-2Weyburn Red Wings defeated Humboldt Broncos 4-games-to-none1986 Won League, Lost Anavet CupHumboldt Broncos defeated Yorkton Terriers 4-games-to-noneHumboldt Broncos defeated Swift Current Indians 4-games-to-noneHumboldt Broncos defeated Estevan Bruins 4-games-to-3 SAJHL CHAMPIONS
Winnipeg South Blues (MJHL) defeated Humboldt Broncos 4-games-to-31987 Won League, Won Anavet Cup, Lost Abbott Cup, Hosted 1987 Centennial Cup, Lost FinalHumboldt Broncos defeated Melville Millionaires 4-games-to-1Humboldt Broncos defeated Yorkton Terriers 4-games-to-noneHumboldt Broncos defeated Lloydminster Lancers 4-games-to-none SAJHL CHAMPIONS
Humboldt Broncos defeated Selkirk Steelers (MJHL) 4-games-to-none ANAVET CUP CHAMPIONS
Richmond Sockeyes (BCJHL) defeated Humboldt Broncos 4-games-to-3First in Centennial Cup round robin (3–0)
Richmond Sockeyes (BCJHL) defeated Humboldt Broncos 5–2 in Final
1988 Lost Semi-finalHumboldt Broncos defeated Estevan Bruins 4-games-to-1Yorkton Terriers defeated Humboldt Broncos 4-games-to-11989 Won League, Won Anavet Cup, Lost Abbott CupHumboldt Broncos defeated Estevan Bruins 4-games-to-noneHumboldt Broncos defeated Yorkton Terriers 4-games-to-1Humboldt Broncos defeated Nipawin Hawks 4-games-to-1 SJHL CHAMPIONS
Humboldt Broncos defeated Winnipeg South Blues (MJHL) 4-games-to-1 ANAVET CUP CHAMPIONS
Vernon Lakers (BCJHL) defeated Humboldt Broncos 4-games-to-21990 Lost Semi-finalHumboldt Broncos defeated Melville Millionaires 4-games-to-1Yorkton Terriers defeated Humboldt Broncos 4-games-to-21991 Lost FinalHumboldt Broncos defeated Battlefords North Stars 4-games-to-2Humboldt Broncos defeated Nipawin Hawks 4-games-to-3Yorkton Terriers defeated Humboldt Broncos 4-games-to-none1992 Lost Semi-finalHumboldt Broncos defeated Flin Flon Bombers 4-games-to-1Melfort Mustangs defeated Humboldt Broncos 4-games-to-21993 Lost Quarter-finalFlin Flon Bombers defeated Humboldt Broncos 4-games-to-11994 Lost Semi-finalHumboldt Broncos defeated Battlefords North Stars 4-games-to-3Melfort Mustangs defeated Humboldt Broncos 4-games-to-none1995 Lost PreliminaryKindersley Klippers defeated Humboldt Broncos 2-games-to-11996 Lost Quarter-finalHumboldt Broncos defeated Flin Flon Bombers 2-games-to-noneMelfort Mustangs defeated Humboldt Broncos 4-games-to-none1997 Lost PreliminaryKindersley Klippers defeated Humboldt Broncos 2-games-to-none1998 Lost PreliminaryBattlefords North Stars defeated Humboldt Broncos 2-games-to-none1999 Lost FinalHumboldt Broncos defeated Kindersley Klippers 4-games-to-2Humboldt Broncos defeated Melfort Mustangs 4-games-to-noneEstevan Bruins defeated Humboldt Broncos 4-games-to-none2000 Lost Semi-finalSecond in round robin (2–2) vs. Kindersley Klippers and Nipawin Hawks
Humboldt Broncos defeated Flin Flon Bombers 4-games-to-noneBattlefords North Stars defeated Humboldt Broncos 4-games-to-32001 Lost Quarter-finalFlin Flon Bombers defeated Humboldt Broncos 4-games-to-12002 Lost FinalHumboldt Broncos defeated Estevan Bruins 4-games-to-1Humboldt Broncos defeated Notre Dame Hounds 4-games-to-1Kindersley Klippers defeated Humboldt Broncos 4-games-to-32003 Won League, Won Anavet Cup, Won 2003 Royal Bank CupHumboldt Broncos defeated Melfort Mustangs 4-games-to-noneHumboldt Broncos defeated Battlefords North Stars 4-games-to-2Humboldt Broncos defeated Melville Millionaires 4-games-to-none SJHL CHAMPIONS
Humboldt Broncos defeated OCN Blizzard (MJHL) 4-games-to-1 ANAVET CUP CHAMPIONS
Second in 2003 Royal Bank Cup round robin (2–2)
Humboldt Broncos defeated Wellington Dukes (OPJHL) 3–2 in semi-final
Humboldt Broncos defeated Camrose Kodiaks (AJHL) 3–1 in final ROYAL BANK CUP CHAMPIONS
2004 Lost Semi-finalHumboldt Broncos defeated Nipawin Hawks 4-games-to-3Kindersley Klippers defeated Humboldt Broncos 4-games-to-22005 Lost Quarter-finalHumboldt Broncos defeated Weyburn Red Wings 4-games-to-3Estevan Bruins defeated Humboldt Broncos 4-games-to-none2006 Lost PreliminaryWeyburn Red Wings defeated Humboldt Broncos 4-games-to-22007 Won League, Lost Anavet CupFirst in round robin (2–1–1) vs. Battlefords North Stars and Melfort Mustangs
Humboldt Broncos defeated Melfort Mustangs 4-games-to-3Humboldt Broncos defeated Nipawin Hawks 4-games-to-2Humboldt Broncos defeated Melville Millionaires 4-games-to-1 SJHL CHAMPIONS
Selkirk Steelers (MJHL) defeated Humboldt Broncos 4-games-to-32008 Won League, Won Anavet Cup, Won 2008 Royal Bank CupFirst in round robin (2–0) vs. Melfort Mustangs and Flin Flon Bombers
Humboldt Broncos defeated Nipawin Hawks 4-games-to-2Humboldt Broncos defeated Flin Flon Bombers 4-games-to-noneHumboldt Broncos defeated Kindersley Klippers 4-games-to-3 SJHL CHAMPIONS
Humboldt Broncos defeated Portage Terriers (MJHL) 4-games-to-none ANAVET CUP CHAMPIONS
Second in 2008 Royal Bank Cup round robin (2–2)
Humboldt Broncos defeated Cornwall Colts (CJHL) 6–1 in semi-final
Humboldt Broncos defeated Camrose Kodiaks (AJHL) 1–0 in final ROYAL BANK CUP CHAMPIONS
2009 Won League, Won Anavet Cup, Lost 2009 Royal Bank Cup finalHumboldt Broncos defeated Battlefords North Stars 4-games-to-2Humboldt Broncos defeated Flin Flon Bombers 4-games-to-noneHumboldt Broncos defeated Melville Millionaires 4-games-to-1 SJHL CHAMPIONS
Humboldt Broncos defeated Portage Terriers (MJHL) 4-games-to-3 ANAVET CUP CHAMPIONS
Second in 2009 Royal Bank Cup round robin (2–2)
Humboldt Broncos defeated Victoria Grizzlies (BCHL) 3–2 OT in semi-final
Vernon Vipers (BCHL) defeated Humboldt Broncos 2–0 in final
2010 Lost PreliminaryLa Ronge Ice Wolves defeated Humboldt Broncos 3-games-to-none2011 Lost Quarter-finalMelfort Mustangs defeated Humboldt Broncos 4-games-to-2" 
2012 Won League, Won Anavet Cup, Lost Royal Bank Cup Semi-final
Humboldt Broncos defeated La Ronge Ice Wolves 4-games-to-0
Humboldt Broncos defeated Battlefords North Stars 4-games-to-2
Humboldt Broncos defeated Weyburn Red Wings 4-games-to-2 SJHL CHAMPIONS
Humboldt Broncos defeated Portage Terriers (MJHL) 4-games-to-3 ANAVET CUP CHAMPIONS
First in 2012 Royal Bank Cup round robin (4–0)
Woodstock Slammers (MHL) defeated Humboldt Broncos 4–3 OT in semi-final
2013 Lost Final
Humboldt Broncos defeated Melfort Mustangs 4-games-to-1
Humboldt Broncos defeated Flin Flon Bombers 4-games-to-1
Yorkton Terriers defeated Humboldt Broncos 4-games-to-2
2014 Lost Semi-final
Humboldt Broncos defeated Melfort Mustangs 4-games-to-1
Yorkton Terriers defeated Humboldt Broncos 4-games-to-1
2015 Lost Wildcard
Weyburn Red Wings defeated Humboldt Broncos 3-games-to–1 
2016 DNQ
2017 Lost Quarter-final 
Nipawin Hawks defeated Humboldt Broncos 4-games–to-0
2018 see Humboldt Broncos bus crash
Humboldt Broncos defeated Flin Flon Bombers 4-games-to-1
Nipawin Hawks were leading Humboldt Broncos 3-games-to-1 when the fatal Broncos bus crash occurred on April 6, 2018 on their way to Game 5.

Retired numbers
On September 12, 2018, all the uniform numbers of the 29 players/coaches/support staff involved in the April 6, 2018 bus crash were retired by the team.

NHL alumni

 Sheldon Brookbank – Nashville Predators, New Jersey Devils, Anaheim Ducks, Chicago Blackhawks
 Kelly Chase – St. Louis Blues, Hartford Whalers, Toronto Maple Leafs
Mike Colman – San Jose Sharks
 Curt Giles – Minnesota North Stars, New York Rangers, St. Louis Blues
 Bill McDougall – Detroit Red Wings, Edmonton Oilers, Tampa Bay Lightning
 Gerard Waslen - Toronto Maple Leafs
 Terry Ruskowski – Winnipeg Jets, Chicago Blackhawks, Los Angeles Kings, Pittsburgh Penguins, Minnesota North Stars

See also
 List of ice hockey teams in Saskatchewan
 Humboldt Broncos bus crash
 Kids Help Phone

References

External links
Official Website
Humboldt Broncos statistics at hockeydb.com
Elgar Petersen Arena at RinkAtlas.com

Humboldt, Saskatchewan
Saskatchewan Junior Hockey League teams
1970 establishments in Saskatchewan
Ice hockey clubs established in 1970
1970 establishments in Canada